Chase the Sun may refer to:

 Chase the Sun (The O.C. Supertones album), released 1999
 Chase the Sun (Shannon Lawson album), released 2002
 Chase the Sun (EP) by Dragon, 2011
 "Chase the Sun (song)", a song by Planet Funk, 2001
 "Chase the Sun", a song by Corey Hart from Young Man Running released 1988

See also 
 Chasing the Sun (disambiguation)